Vladimir Polyakov (born 17 April 1960) is a retired pole vaulter who represented the Soviet Union and later Russia. On 26 June 1981 he managed to clear 5.81 metres, beating Thierry Vigneron's six-day-old world record. Two years later Polyakov lost the record to Pierre Quinon, who jumped 5.82. Polyakov won a silver medal at the 1982 European Championships, and won the European Indoor Championships in 1983.

Achievements

References

1960 births
Living people
Soviet male pole vaulters
Russian male pole vaulters
World record setters in athletics (track and field)
European Athletics Championships medalists
Universiade medalists in athletics (track and field)
Universiade silver medalists for the Soviet Union
Medalists at the 1981 Summer Universiade